The Greater Glory is a 1926 American silent drama film directed by Curt Rehfeld. The film starred Conway Tearle and Boris Karloff.  The Greater Glory is sometimes listed as The Viennese Medley, the title of Edith O'Shaughnessy's novel of which the film is based.

Cast

 Conway Tearle as Count Maxim von Hurtig
 Anna Q. Nilsson as Fanny
 May Allison as Corinne
 Ian Keith as Pauli Birbach
 Lucy Beaumont as Tante Ilde
 Jean Hersholt as Gustav Schmidt
 Nigel De Brulier as Dr. Hermann von Berg
 Bridgetta Clark as Mitzi, his wife
 John St. Polis as Professor Leopold Eberhardt (as John Sainpolis)
 Marcia Manon as Kaethe, his wife
 Edward Earle as Otto Steiner
 Virginia Southern as Liesel, his wife
 Isabelle Keith as Anna, Pauli's wife
 Kathleen Chambers as Irma von Berg, the stepmother
 Hale Hamilton as Leon Krum
 Cora Macey as Marie
 Carrie Daumery as Countess von Hurtig
 Thur Fairfax as Theodore von Hurtig
 Boris Karloff as Scissors Grinder
 George A. Billings as Cross Bearer (as George Billings)
 Bess Flowers as Helga
 Marcelle Corday as Maid
 Virginia Davis as Resi
 Florence Lawrence
 Mary Jane Milliken as Elsie Eberhardt - Little girl
 Billy Seay as Gusel Von Berg
 Louise Emmons (uncredited)

Preservation
With no prints of The Greater Glory located in any film archives, it is a lost film.

See also
 Boris Karloff filmography

References

External links

Still at silenthollywood.com
Still at www.valentinovamp.com

1926 films
1926 lost films
1926 romantic drama films
1920s war drama films
American romantic drama films
American silent feature films
American war drama films
American black-and-white films
Films based on American novels
Films set in the 1910s
Films set in Vienna
First National Pictures films
Lost American films
Lost romantic drama films
1920s American films
Silent romantic drama films
Silent war drama films
Silent American drama films